The 2016 The Hague Open was a professional tennis tournament played on clay courts. It was the 24th edition of the tournament and was part of the 2016 ATP Challenger Tour. It took place in Scheveningen, Netherlands between 25 and 31 July 2016.

Singles main-draw entrants

Seeds

 1 Rankings are as of July 18, 2016.

Other entrants
The following players received wildcards into the singles main draw:
  Jesse Huta Galung
  Stefanos Tsitsipas
  Tallon Griekspoor
  Tim van Rijthoven

The following player received entry into the singles main draw with a protected ranking:
  Boy Westerhof

The following players received entry from the qualifying draw:
  Juan Ignacio Galarza
  George von Massow
  Peter Torebko
  Antoine Hoang

The following player entered as a lucky loser:
  Gibril Diarra

Champions

Singles

 Robin Haase def.  Adam Pavlásek, 6–4, 6–7(9–11), 6–2

Doubles

 Wesley Koolhof /  Matwé Middelkoop def.  Tallon Griekspoor /  Tim van Rijthoven, 6–1, 3–6, [13–11]

External links
Official Website

The Hague Open
2016
2016 in Dutch tennis